Gerard Alessandrini (born November 27, 1953) is an American playwright, parodist, actor and theatre director best known for creating the award-winning off-Broadway musical theatre parody revue Forbidden Broadway. He is the recipient of Tony Honors for Excellence in Theatre, an Obie Award, four Drama Desk Awards (including the Drama Desk Award for Outstanding Lyrics and the Drama Desk Special Award), an Outer Critics Circle Award, and two Lucille Lortel Awards, as well as the Drama League Award for Lifetime Achievement in Musical Theatre.

Life and career
Alessandrini was born in Boston, Massachusetts, grew up in suburban Needham, and graduated from Xaverian Brothers High School in 1972.  After graduating from the Boston Conservatory of Music in 1976, he moved to New York City. As a young actor in summer stock, regional theater and dinner theater, he starred in The Fantasticks, Oklahoma and Carousel, among others. He also worked at the off-Broadway Light Opera of Manhattan.

In late 1981, Alessandrini conceived and wrote a musical parody revue featuring spoofs of songs from Broadway musicals on which he had been working for some time. After a few months of weekend performances starring Alessandrini and a few friends at Palsson's Supper Club, the show evolved into Forbidden Broadway, which opened on January 15, 1982, at Palsson's, directed by Alessandrini. He continued to appear in the revue, which caught the theatergoing public's attention after Rex Reed published a rave review and ultimately ran for 2,332 performances in a number of venues. It has subsequently been rewritten several times to include parodies of newer shows and ran almost continuously for 25 years with productions both in and outside New York. In 2006, the show and Alessandrini won Tony Honors for Excellence in Theatre. The last incarnation, called Forbidden Broadway Comes Out Swinging played Off-Broadway's Davenport Theatre in 2014.

Alessandrini can be heard on five of the eight Forbidden Broadway cast albums, as well as the soundtracks of Disney's animated films Aladdin and Pocahontas. His directorial credits include Equity Library Theatre's revival of Gigi and Maury Yeston's 1998 show In the Beginning. In 1991, he co-wrote, directed and performed in the television parody Masterpiece Tonight, a satirical salute to the 20th anniversary of Masterpiece Theatre. In 1995, some of his sketches were featured in Carol Burnett’s CBS special, Men, Movies and Carol.  He has also written comedy specials for Bob Hope and Angela Lansbury for NBC.

During summer 2001, Alessandrini introduced his Gongcores series with a tongue-in-cheek production of the 1962 Irving Berlin musical Mr. President. In 2011, he co-created the musical comedy, The Nutcracker and I, with music by Tchaikovsky, book by Peter Brash and lyrics by Alessandrini.  The musical debuted at the George Street Playhouse in New Brunswick, New Jersey during the 2011 Christmas season, directed by the theatre's artistic director, David Saint.<ref>[http://www.georgestreetplayhouse.org/mainstage/thenutcrackerandi The Nutcracker and I"] .  George Street Playhouse, accessed August 1, 2011</ref>

In 2016, Alessandrini wrote the revue Spamilton, which premiered at the Triad Theater in New York and also plays at the Royal George Theatre in Chicago. It parodies Hamilton'' and other Broadway shows and caricatures various Broadway stars.

References

External links
Official Forbidden Broadway website
Official Spamilton website
 
Profile of and interview with Alessandrini

American musical theatre composers
American musical theatre lyricists
American theatre directors
American male musical theatre actors
20th-century American dramatists and playwrights
Writers from Boston
1953 births
Living people
Boston Conservatory at Berklee alumni
Xaverian Brothers High School alumni